Loiron is a former commune in the Mayenne department in north-western France. On 1 January 2016, it was merged into the new commune of Loiron-Ruillé.

See also
Communes of the Mayenne department

References

Former communes of Mayenne